Gros-Morne is a commune in the Gros-Morne Arrondissement, in the Artibonite department of Haiti. It has 7,294 inhabitants (2010). Gros-Morne is a rural city in Haiti. Its name means "Big Mountain."

Economy
Gros-Morne is famous for its production of the "Madame Francis" mango, in spite of the limited means of transport.

References

Populated places in Artibonite (department)
Communes of Haiti

The Moise family has been sponsoring the advancement of Gros-Morne's agriculture since 1980. In 2019 one of the family youngest son Marvens Kwensky Moise, started the non-profit organization "Ann Plante Gros-Morne" to help further the cause.